The state counsellor of Myanmar was the de facto head of government of Myanmar, equivalent to a prime minister, from 2016 to 2021. The office was created in 2016 after Aung San Suu Kyi's National League for Democracy won the 2015 Myanmar general election so she could lead the government despite being constitutionally ineligible for the presidency. The officeholder could “contact ministries, departments, organizations, associations and individuals” in an official capacity, while being accountable to parliament. The office was abolished by Aung San Suu Kyi's political adversary, Commander-in-Chief of Defence Services Min Aung Hlaing, after he seized power from her in a 2021 military coup d'état.

Background
The post was created on 6 April 2016 to allow for a greater role for Aung San Suu Kyi within the Government of Myanmar. Aung San Suu Kyi's National League for Democracy won a landslide victory in the 2015 Myanmar general election; however she is constitutionally barred from becoming President of Myanmar as her late husband Michael Aris was British and her two children also hold British nationality.

The bill to create the post was passed by the upper house of the Assembly of the Union on 1 April 2016 and by the lower house on 5 April 2016, and signed by President Htin Kyaw on 6 April 2016. The law explicitly references Aung San Suu Kyi, and references several priorities, including cultivation of a multi-party democratic system, proper implementation of a market economy system, establishment of a federal union, and establishment of domestic peace and development.

Roles and responsibilities
The post was similar to that of a prime minister in that it allowed the holder to work across all areas of government and to act as a link between the executive and legislative branches. The State Counsellor had a term of five years, the same term as that of the president.

List of state counsellors

See also
 Politics of Myanmar
 President of Myanmar
 Vice President of Myanmar
 Prime Minister of Myanmar
 Ministry of State Counsellor’s Office
 Chairman of the State Administrative Council

References

External links
 Office of the State Counsellor (Burmese)
 Office of the State Counsellor (English)

Politics of Myanmar
Aung San Suu Kyi